Still River is a village located on the west side of the town of Harvard, Worcester County, Massachusetts, United States.

Noted for its views of Mount Wachusett, Still River is home to Saint Benedict Abbey, St. Benedict Center, Harvard Historical Society, Willard Farm Stand, various hills, meadows, and wetlands.

The zip code is 01467.

Father Leonard Feeney was a Jesuit priest who held to a literal interpretation of the doctrine "Extra Ecclesiam nulla salus" (or "outside the Church there is no salvation"). Feeney was excommunicated in 1953. Under the direction of Feeney, Catherine Goddard Clarke and others organized into a group called the Slaves of the Immaculate Heart of Mary, an unofficial Catholic entity. In January 1958, the community moved from Cambridge to the town of Harvard. Eventually, The original community split into several groups: the Benedictines, the Sisters of Saint Ann's House and Sisters of St. Benedict's center, Slaves of the Immaculate Heart of Mary. A further split later occurred with some members of the Slaves of the Immaculate Heart of Mary leaving to establish a separate group in New Hampshire.
A branch of the Saint Benedict Center is located in Still River, on the west side of the town of Harvard.

References

External links
 

Villages in Worcester County, Massachusetts